Aspergillus rambellii is a species of fungus in the genus Aspergillus. It is from the Ochraceorosei section. The species was first described in 2005. It accumulates very large amounts of sterigmatocystin, 3-O-methylsterigmatocystin and aflatoxin B1.

Growth and morphology

A. rambellii has been cultivated on both Czapek yeast extract agar (CYA) plates and Malt Extract Agar Oxoid® (MEAOX) plates. The growth morphology of the colonies can be seen in the pictures below.

References

Further reading

rambellii